Nutbourne Windmill is a tower mill at Nutbourne, Sussex, England which has been converted to retail use.

History

Nutbourne Windmill was built in 1854. It had a short working life, stopping c.1894. The mill gradually became derelict, although the cap was still on the mill during the Second World War. At some point, the tail beam failed, and the windshaft was left hanging down vertically at the top of the tower, supported  by the stocks alone. The mill tower now serves as a tasting room and shop for Nutbourne vineyards.

Description

Nutbourne Windmill is a five-storey brick and stone tower mill with a stage at first floor level. The mill had a beehive cap, winded by a fantail and is thought to have had four Spring sails. The mill drove two pairs of underdrift millstones.

Millers

Messrs Reed and Stillwell 1890

References for above:-

References

External links
Windmill World Page on Nutbourne  windmill.

Further reading
 Online version

Tower mills in the United Kingdom
Grinding mills in the United Kingdom
Tourist attractions in West Sussex
Windmills completed in 1854
Windmills in West Sussex
1854 establishments in England